The 1967 season was Djurgårdens IF's 67th in existence, their 22nd season in Allsvenskan and their fifth consecutive season in the league. They were competing in Allsvenskan, Svenska Cupen and European Cup.

Player statistics
Appearances for competitive matches only.

|}

Goals

Total

Allsvenskan

Svenska Cupen

European Cup
no goals

Competitions

Overall

Allsvenskan

League table

Matches

Svenska Cupen

European Cup

First round

References

Djurgårdens IF Fotboll seasons
Djurgarden